The following is a list of films produced and/or released by Columbia Pictures in 1980–1989. Most films listed here were distributed theatrically in the United States by the company's distribution division, Sony Pictures Releasing (formerly known as Triumph Releasing Corporation (1982–1994) and Columbia TriStar Film Distributors International (1991–2005)). It is one of the Big Five film studios. Columbia Pictures is a subsidiary of Japanese conglomerate Sony.

See also
 
 Columbia Pictures
 List of TriStar Pictures films
 List of Screen Gems films
 Sony Pictures Classics
 :Category:Lists of films by studio

References

1970
American films by studio
Sony Pictures Entertainment Motion Picture Group